Dave Rader may refer to:

David Rader (born 1957), former American football coach and player
Dave Rader (baseball) (born 1948), retired Major League Baseball player